The 105 mm Indian field gun is a towed howitzer developed in India and extensively used in the Indian Army.

Development
The gun was designed and developed by the Armament Research and Development Establishment (ARDE) in 1972 to replace the 25-pounder guns used by the Indian Army. It was produced in the Gun Carriage Factory (GCF), Jabalpur, from 1984. In addition to the GCF, the guns have been manufactured at Field Gun Factory, Kanpur. 
The shells are manufactured at ordnance factories in Ambajhari and Chandrapur. It shares many features with the British L118 light gun. Due to its excellent portability, it is suitable for mountainous and other difficult terrains.

Variants
Towed
The Indian field gun (IFG) weighs 3,450 kg, while the light field gun (LFG) variant weighs 2,380 kg. Both guns have a normal rate of fire of four rounds per minute over ranges from 2,000 to 17,400 metres. It can sustain an intense rate of fire of six rounds per minute for up to 10 minutes and a sustained rate of fire for up to one hour. It has a crew of six. The gun has a secondary anti-tank capability. It can operate in temperatures ranging from -27 to +60 °C. The recoil on firing is absorbed by two side-mounted hydraulic cylinders. A circular platform provided with the gun can be used for rapid 360° movement. The light field gun can be broken down into two or three parts for easy transport and quickly re-assembled. The LFG can be heli-lifted and paradropped.
Indian field gun Mark 1
Indian field gun Mark 2
Indian field gun Mark 3
Light field gun Mark 1
Light field gun Mark 2
Self propelled
OFB 105 mm SPG – consists of a BMP Sarath hull mounted with a light field gun. It was developed by ordnance development centre, Ordnance Factory Medak, but has not been inducted into the Indian Army.
Garuda 105 – developed by Kalyani Strategic Systems, a subsidiary of Bharat Forge

Operators

 : 10 in service (aid from India for use against insurgency groups operating from Myanmar)

See also 

 M119 howitzer
 L118 light gun

References

105 mm artillery
Artillery of India
Howitzers
Military equipment introduced in the 1970s